The SGB Championship 2019 is the second division of Great British speedway. The season runs between March and October 2019 and consisted of 12 participating teams. The current league champions are the Workington Comets who completed an excellent 2018 season winning three major trophies. Four new teams joined the SGB Championship in 2019 with two of them dropping down from the 2018 SGB Premiership league season these teams were Leicester Lions and Somerset Rebels with Ipswich Witches and Peterborough Panthers moving in the opposite direction. Two teams from the third tier of British speedway the National League Birmingham Brummies and Eastbourne Eagles moved up into this season's league while the Lakeside Hammers did not compete.

On 14 January 2019, the Workington Comets management announced that they would not be competing in the league in 2019 for financial reasons.

Regulation changes
At the Speedway AGM in November 2018, a number of changes were made to the rules and regulations for 2019. The biggest change was the lowering of teams' points averages to 38.00 per team; this was done to reduce the running costs of teams. Riders who started out in the National League would receive a 2.5% reduction on their average. New riders who have previously ridden in the professional leagues in either Poland, Sweden or Denmark would automatically be given a 5.00 average and riders who have never ridden in these leagues would be awarded a 4.00 average. There were a number of line-up changes for the 2019 season. The Leicester Lions and Somerset Rebels dropped down from the SGB Premiership after the 2018 season.

Results
Teams face each other two times: once home and once away.

Fixtures

League table
Final Table Up To And Including Friday 4 October

Play-offs

Home team scores are in bold
Overall aggregate scores are in red

Semi-finals

Grand final

Leading averages

Knockout Cup
The 2019 SGB Championship Knockout Cup was the 52nd edition of the Knockout Cup for tier two teams.

KO Cup stages

Home team scores are in bold
Overall aggregate scores are in red

Round 1

Quarter-finals

Semi-finals

Grand final

Championship Shield

Borders Group

Fixtures

Table

Borders Group Table
Final Table Up To And Including Friday 24 May

Northern Group

Fixtures

Table

Northern Group Table
Final Table Up To And Including Friday 3 May

Southern Group

Fixtures

Table

Southern Group Table
Final Table Up To And Including Wednesday 1 May

Play-offs

Home team scores are in bold
Overall aggregate scores are in red
The best second place team from the three qualifying group stage also  qualified for the semi finals.

Semi-finals

Grand final

SGB Championship Riders Championship

Sunday 1 September staged at Owlerton Stadium, Sheffield

Final

1st Erik Riss (Redcar Bears)
2nd Danny King (Sheffield Tigers)
3rd Ryan Douglas (Leicester Lions)
4th Sam Masters (Edinburgh Monarchs)

semi final

1st Erik Riss (Redcar Bears)
2nd Danny King (Sheffield Tigers)
Qualified for the Grand Final

3rd Jake Allen (Scunthorpe Scorpions)
4th Adam Ellis (Birmingham Brummies)

Qualifying scores

Sam Masters (Edinburgh Monarchs) 12
Ryan Douglas (Leicester Lions) 12
Qualified for the Grand Final

Erik Riss (Redcar Bears) 12
Danny King (Sheffield Tigers) 10
Jake Allen (Scunthorpe Scorpions) 10
Adam Ellis (Birmingham Brummies) 9

Qualified for the semi-final

Chris Harris (Somerset Rebels) 9
Richard Lawson (Eastbourne Eagles) 9
Rasmus Jensen (Glasgow Tigers) 8
Nick Morris (Somerset Rebels) 6
Todd Kurtz (Sheffield Tigers) 6
Zane Kennedy (Sheffield Tigers) 5
Steve Worrall (Newcastle Diamonds) 5
Jye Etheridge (Berwick Bandits) 4
Josh Auty (Scunthorpe Scorpions) 2
Joe Lawlor (Leicester Lions) (res) 1
Craig Cook (Glasgow Tigers) 0
Tom Wooley (Redcar Bears) (res) 0

The following did not partake in the meeting even though they had qualified
Edward Kennett (Eastbourne Eagles), Scott Nicholls (Leicester Lions), Charles Wright (Redcar Bears)

Referee's Official Group Stage Result Score Sheet

SGB Championship Pairs

Friday 20 September Staged at Oak Tree Arena, Somerset

Final

Glasgow Tigers beat Leicester Lions

Semi finals

Glasgow Tigers beat Sheffield Tigers
Leicester Lions beat Birmingham Brummies

Qualifying score

Glasgow Tigers 25
Birmingham Brummies 22
Leicester Lions 21
Sheffield Tigers 20
Qualified for Semi Finals
Scunthorpe Scorpions 20
Redcar Bears 19
Eastbourne Eagles 18
Birmingham Brummies 22
Newcastle Diamonds 15
Somerset Rebels 15
Edinburgh Monarchs 13
Berwick Bandits 10

Referee's Official SGB Championship Pairs Result Score Sheet

SGB Championship Fours

Sunday 23 June staged at East of England Showground, Peterborough

Final

Somerset Rebels 22
Sheffield Tigers 19
Glasgow Tigers 19
Eastbourne Eagles 12

Danny King (Sheffield Tigers) beat Craig Cook (Glasgow Tigers) who fell in a run off for second place.

Qualifying scores

Eastbourne Eagles 15
Glasgow Tigers 15
Sheffield Tigers 15
Somerset Rebels 14
Qualified For Final

Edinburgh Monarchs 13
Leicester Lions 12
Newcastle Diamonds 11
Redcar Bears 10
Scunthorpe Scorpions 10
Berwick Bandits 9
Birmingham Brummies 8

SGB Championship Fours Result
Referee's Official Group Stage Result Score Sheet 
Referee's Official Final Result Score Sheet

Teams and final averages
Berwick Bandits

 8.09
 7.82
 7.63
 7.67
 6.81
 6.32
 5.71
 4.33

27 August Thomas H. Jonasson replaced the injured Nikolaj Busk Jakobsen in the Berwick Bandits team

Birmingham Brummies

 8.50
 7.60
 7.19
 6.67
 6.24
 6.00
 5.84
 4.36
 4.00
 4.00
 3.43
 3.27
 3.23
 2.81
 1.33

7 May Adam Ellis and Nathan Stoneman replaced Kyle Newman and Tobias Thomsen in the Birmingham Brummies team
31 May Tero Aarnio replaced Ulrich Østergaard in the Birmingham Brummies team
1 July Nick Agertoft replaced the retired Zach Wajtknecht and Danyon Hume replaced Nathan Stoneman in the Birmingham Brummies team
23 July Jason Garrity replaced the injured Nick Morris and David Wallinger replaced Danyon Hume in the Birmingham Brummies team
4 August Jordan Jenkins replaced David Wallinger in the Birmingham Brummies team
26 August Tom Perry replaced Jordan Jenkins who quit the Birmingham Brummies team

Eastbourne Eagles

 9.32
 8.83
 8.23
 6.59
 6.26
 5.36
 4.37
 3.95
 3.38

21 May Kyle Newman replaced the injured Tom Brennan in the Eastbourne Eagles team
17 July Jason Edwards replaced Ben Morley in the Eastbourne Eagles team

Edinburgh Monarchs

 10.86
 8.40
 7.82
 7.58
 6.72
 6.20
 5.52
 5.13
 4.46
 3.54
 3.33

30 May Victor Palovaara replaced the injured Justin Sedgmen in the Edinburgh Monarchs team
15 July Sam Masters and Matt Marson replaced Victor Palovaara and Joel Andersson in the Edinburgh Monarchs team
1 August James Sarjeant replaced Matt Marson in the Edinburgh Monarchs team

Glasgow Tigers

 10.72
 9.05
 8.72
 7.19
 5.37
 4.89
 4.54
 3.72
 2.52
 0.33

22 February Kyle Bickley replaced Joe Lawlor in the Glasgow Tigers team
25 May Connor Bailey replaced Luke Chessell in the Glasgow Tigers team
1 August Mikkel B. Andersen replaced James Sarjeant in the Glasgow Tigers team
6 August Sam Jensen replaced the injured Paul Starke in the Glasgow Tigers team

Leicester Lions

 9.23
 8.82
 8.81
 7.43
 7.30
 7.15
 6.25
 3.35
 2.50

10 July Joe Lawlor replaced Jack Thomas in the Leicester Lions team
1 August Ty Proctor replaced the injured Josh Bates in the Leicester Lions team

Newcastle Diamonds

 8.33
 7.60
 6.94
 6.93
 6.64
 5.57
 3.41
 3.06
 2.67

4 March Steve Worrall replaced Nike Lunna in the Newcastle Diamonds team, with them also releasing Victor Palovaara
5 March Simon Lambert was signed to replace Victor Palovaara
29 May Jacob Bukhave replaced Simon Lambert
10 July Ulrich Østergaard replaced Jacob Bukhave

Redcar Bears

 9.60
 9.00
 7.89
 6.80
 6.31
 5.79
 5.46
 5.41
 4.48
 4.18
 1.65

3 June Ben Barker was released by the Redcar Bears team
4 June Ulrich Østergaard joined the Redcar Bears team
1 July Erik Riss, Kasper Andersen and Tom Woolley replaced Ulrich Østergaard, Jack Smith and the injured Tom Bacon in the Redcar Bears team

Scunthorpe Scorpions

 8.13
 7.88
 7.81
 7.39
 6.54
 6.02
 5.57
 3.52
 3.50
 1.09

8 April Danny Ayres replaced Jedd List in the Scunthorpe Scorpions team
29 June Simon Lambert and Ben Barker replaced Josh Bailey and the injured Jason Garrity in the Scunthorpe Scorpions team

Sheffield Tigers

 8.82
 7.81
 7.70
 6.41
 6.03
 5.70
 4.95
 4.76
 4.74
 4.58

4 June Josh MacDonald replaced Kasper Andersen in the Sheffield Tigers team
31 July Todd Kurtz and Justin Sedgmen replaced Ty Proctor and the injured Broc Nicol in the Sheffield Tigers team
27 August Broc Nicol replaced Drew Kemp in the Sheffield Tigers team

Somerset Rebels

 9.37
 9.37
 8.63
 8.44
 5.86
 5.33
 4.53
 2.91
 2.58
 0.80

26 July Valentin Grobauer quits racing the Somerset Rebels team
28 July Henry Atkins quits racing the Somerset Rebels team
29 July Nick Morris, Nathan Stoneman and Luke Harris replaced resigned riders Valentin Grobauer, Henry Atkins, and Todd Kurtz in the team

See also
List of United Kingdom speedway league champions
Knockout Cup (speedway)

References

SGB Championship
SGB Championship
2019